Harold Bruce Allsopp FSA FRIBA (4 July 1912 – 22 February 2000) was a British architectural historian, educator and publisher.

Career 
Howard Bruce Allsopp was born in 1912 in Oxford to Heny Allsopp, a historian, poet and vice principal of Ruskin College, and his wife Elizabeth May Allsopp (née Robertson). Bruce Allsopp attended Crimsworth School and Manchester Grammar School before studying architecture at the University of Liverpool School of Architecture under Sir Charles Reilly, Sir Patrick Abercrombie and Lionel Bailey Budden.  He served in the Royal Engineers during World War II and taught at Leeds School of Art from 1935 to 1946. During 1935 he married Florence Cyrilla Woodroffe. From 1946 he taught at Newcastle University School of Architecture (originally part of Durham University), where he held a variety of posts, including senior lecturer and director of architectural studies. In 1957 he was elected a fellow of the Royal Institute of British Architects.

Allsopp was a co-founder of the Society of Architectural Historians of Great Britain in 1955 and served as its first chair. In 1962 he founded the Oriel Press. In 1970 he was elected as the Master of the Art Workers' Guild.

Allsopp said in Architect and Patron:

Selected published works 
 Art and the Nature of Architecture 1952
 Decoration Furniture Vol. 1. The English Tradition 1952 
 A History of Renaissance Architecture 1959
 A General History of Architecture 1960
 A History of Classical Architecture  1965
 The Great Tradition of Western Architecture 1968
 Historic Architecture of Newcastle upon Tyne 1969
 Modern Architecture of Northern England 1969
 The Study of Architectural History 1970
 Romanesque Architecture: the Romanesque achievement 1971
 A Modern Theory of Architecture 1977
 The Garden Earth. The Case for Ecological Morality 1972
 Towards a Humane Architecture 1974
 The Larousse Guide to the Architecture of Europe 1985
 Spirit of Europe: a subliminal history  1997

References 

Architectural historians
1912 births
2000 deaths
Fellows of the Society of Antiquaries of London
Fellows of the Royal Institute of British Architects
Masters of the Art Worker's Guild